Kanaya may refer to
Kanaya (surname)
Kanaya Maryam, a character from the webcomic Homestuck (2009-2016)
Kanaya, Shizuoka, a former town in Shizuoka Prefecture, Japan
Kanaya Station, an interchange railway station in Shizuoka Prefecture, Japan
Shin-Kanaya Station, a railway station in Shizuoka Prefecture, Japan
Kanaya, Wakayama, a former town in Wakayama Prefecture, Japan
Kanaya-juku, a former station of the Tōkaidō, Japan
Nikkō Kanaya Hotel in Tochigi Prefecture, Japan
Hamakanaya Station in Futtsu, Chiba, Japan
5333 Kanaya, a minor planet